Nordenskiöldbreen (Nordenskiöld Glacier) is a glacier in Spitsbergen, Svalbard. It is named after Finnish geologist Adolf Erik Nordenskiöld (1832–1901).

Geography 
Nordenskiöldbreen is located between Dickson Land and Bünsow Land. It has its terminus in Adolfsbukta, a branch of Billefjorden.

See also 
 List of glaciers

References 

Glaciers of Spitsbergen